Carlos Vera Guardia (30 August 1928 – 22 June 2022) was a Chilean athlete. He competed at the 1948 Summer Olympics and the 1952 Summer Olympics. Vera died in Bloomington, Minnesota on 22 June 2022, at the age of 93.

References

External links
 

1928 births
2022 deaths
People from Iquique
Athletes (track and field) at the 1948 Summer Olympics
Athletes (track and field) at the 1952 Summer Olympics
Athletes (track and field) at the 1955 Pan American Games
Athletes (track and field) at the 1959 Pan American Games
Chilean male long jumpers
Chilean male triple jumpers
Chilean decathletes
Olympic athletes of Chile
Pan American Games competitors for Chile